Truebella is a genus of small true toads, family Bufonidae. It is endemic to the Ayacucho and Junín Regions of Peru. The generic name honors , an American herpetologist.

Species

References

 
Amphibian genera
Frogs of South America
Endemic fauna of Peru